Rivenhall End is a hamlet in the civil parish of Rivenhall near Witham in the Braintree District in the English county of Essex. It is near the village of Rivenhall. For transport there is the busy A12 nearby and Witham railway station.

References 
 http://www.british-towns.net/en/level_4_display.asp?GetL3=17564

Hamlets in Essex
Braintree District